This is a list of publicly traded companies that offer their shareholders the option to be paid with scrip dividends.

References

Dividends
Corporation-related lists